Prokeš (feminine: Prokešová) is a Czech and Slovak family name and may refer to:
Ladislav Prokeš (1884–1966), Czech chess champion and scholar
Zdeněk Prokeš (born 1953), retired Czech footballer
Katka Prokešová (born 1976), Slovak trampolinist
Viera Prokešová (1957–2008), Slovak writer and translator